Minden Township is a township in Pottawattamie County, Iowa, USA.

History
Minden Township takes its name from Minden, in Germany.

References

Townships in Pottawattamie County, Iowa
Townships in Iowa